Methodist Girls' High School (Meghis) is a Ghanaian girls' second-cycle institution at Mamfe, in the Akuapim North District of the Eastern Region.

Mamfe Methodist girls won the 2019 World ROBOFEST competition held at Michigan in the United States of America.

History 
The school was established in 1984 as a private institution called Mamfe State College. However, due to financial, administrative and staffing problems, in 1988 the school was handed over to the Methodist Church Ghana, as a result it was renamed to Methodist High School. Government absorbed the school into the public system in January 1993.

Notable alumni
 Ebony Reigns - dancehall/Afrobeats artist

See also

 Christianity in Ghana
 Education in Ghana
 List of senior high schools in Ghana

References

External links
 , the school's official website

Educational institutions established in 1984
Christian schools in Ghana
Education in the Eastern Region (Ghana)
Girls' schools in Ghana
High schools in Ghana
Methodist schools
1984 establishments in Ghana